The 2015 Torridge District Council election took place on 7 May 2015 to elect members of Torridge District Council in England. This was on the same day as other local elections and the 2015 UK General Election hence turnout was much higher than usual Local Elections.

Results

Changes between elections 
Conservative councillor Peter Le Maistre (Westward Ho!) resigned from the council on 2 November 2017. The seat was gained by Independent candidate Nick Laws on 14 December 2017.

Independent councillor Roger Darch (Torrington, elected UKIP) resigned his seat in October 2017. Cheryl Cottle-Hunkin gained the seat for the Liberal Democrats on 30 November 2017.

UKIP councillor Sam Robinson (Bideford East) died in February 2018. A by-election was held on 3 May 2018, and won by James Hellyer (Conservative).

A by-election in Holsworthy was won by Jon Hutchings (Conservative)

References

2015 English local elections
May 2015 events in the United Kingdom
2015
2010s in Devon